Lieutenant Reginald Milburn Makepeace  (27 December 1890 – 28 May 1918) was a British World War I flying ace credited with 17 aerial victories.

Early life and background
Makepeace was born in Darlington, County Durham, the son of John P. Makepeace, a printer and compositor, and Mary A. Makepeace (née Milburn). The family emigrated to Canada in 1905, eventually settling in Montreal where Makepeace worked for the Canadian Pacific Railway.

World War I flying service
Makepeace was commissioned as a second lieutenant (on probation) in the Royal Flying Corps on 17 November 1916, and was assigned to No. 20 Squadron as a pilot flying a Royal Aircraft Factory FE.2d on 8 June 1917.

He scored his first victory on 29 June 1917, with Lieutenant Melville Waddington as his observer gunner, and gained his second on 6 July, before his period of probation was over, as he was not confirmed in his rank until 12 July. Makepeace triumphed six more times in the FE.2d, including a triple victory on the evening of 27 July, with his eighth win coming on 17 August 1917. His squadron was then re-equipped with the Bristol F.2 Fighter, and he and Waddington were the first to score with the new aircraft when they shot down an Albatros D.V in flames on 3 September. He would score seven more times flying the Bristol, gaining his sixteenth win on 4 January 1918. For his seventeenth and final victory on 28 January 1918 he flew as observer/gunner for pilot Second Lieutenant John Stanley Chick of No. 11 Squadron.

Makepeace was awarded the Military Cross on 26 September 1917, which was gazetted on 9 January 1918. His citation read:
Second Lieutenant Reginald Milburn Makepeace, Royal Flying Corps, Special Reserve.
"For conspicuous gallantry and devotion to duty whilst on an offensive patrol. He and his gunner shot down three enemy aircraft in quick succession, having attacked a large hostile formation, about twenty in number, with great dash and determination."

Makepeace was serving as an instructor at the No. 1 School of Aerial Fighting and Gunnery, based at Turnberry Aerodrome, on 28 May 1918 when the wings of his Bristol F2b fighter folded up in flight, and Makepeace and his crewman Second Lieutenant Thomas Albert McClure were both killed. He is buried at Anfield Cemetery, Liverpool.

Combat record

References

Bibliography

1890 births
1918 deaths
Royal Flying Corps officers
British World War I flying aces
English emigrants to Canada
Recipients of the Military Cross
People from Darlington
Aviators killed in aviation accidents or incidents in Scotland
Royal Air Force personnel of World War I
Victims of aviation accidents or incidents in 1918
Burials at Anfield Cemetery
British Army personnel of World War I
Royal Air Force officers
Military personnel from County Durham
Burials in North West England